Del Rey (Spanish for "Of the King"), Delrey or Del Re may refer to:

Places
 Del Rey, California, a census-designated place in Fresno County
 Del Rey, Los Angeles, California, a small district in the west side of Los Angeles
 Delrey, Illinois, an unincorporated community
 Del Rey Beach State Recreation Site, a state park in Oregon
 Del Rey Oaks, California, a city in Monterey County
 Arganda del Rey, a municipality in Spain
 Caminito del Rey, a walkway in Spain
 Chillarón del Rey, a municipality in Spain
 Hato Mayor del Rey, the capital of Hato Mayor Province, Dominican Republic
 Isla del Rey, Chafarinas, an island in the Chafarinas Islands
 Isla del Rey, Chile, the largest island in the Los Ríos Region
 Isla del Rey, Panama, the largest island in the Pearl Islands
 Jardines del Rey, an archipelago in Cuba
 Jardines del Rey Airport, an airport in Cayo Coco, Cuba
 Laguna del Rey, a municipality in Mexico
 Marina del Rey, California, a census-designated place in Los Angeles County
 Olías del Rey, a municipality in Spain
 Palisades del Rey, California, a former land development in Los Angeles that became Playa del Rey
 Pinar del Rey (park), a public park in San Roque, Cádiz
 Pinar del Rey, Madrid, a ward of Madrid, Spain
 Playa del Rey, California, a neighborhood of Los Angeles
 São João del-Rei, a municipality in Minas Gerais, Brazil
 Sos del Rey Católico, a municipality in Spain

People
 Ana del Rey (born 1985), Spanish actor
Danny Del-Re (born 1968), Australian footballer
Emanuela Del Re (born 1963), Italian politician
 Del Rey (musician) (born 1959), blues singer-songwriter and guitarist
 Judy-Lynn del Rey (1943–1986), editor of science fiction and Lester del Rey's wife
 Lana Del Rey (born 1985), American singer-songwriter
 Lester del Rey (1915–1993), author and editor of science fiction
 Sara Del Rey (born 1980), American professional wrestler

Other uses
 Del Rey (band), an American band
 Del Rey Books, a branch of Random House specializing in fantasy and science fiction books, founded by Lester and Judy Lynn del Rey
 Del Rey Manga, an imprint of Del Rey Books, specializing in manga
 Ford Del Rey, a Brazilian car built from 1981 to 1991
 Copa del Rey, an annual Spanish football cup competition
 Copa del Rey de Baloncesto, an annual Spanish basketball cup competition
 Copa del Rey de Balonmano, an annual Spanish handball cup competition
 Copa del Rey de Futsal, an annual Spanish futsal cup competition
 Copa del Rey de Rugby, an annual Spanish rugby cup competition
 Copa del Rey de Hockey Patines, an annual Spanish rink hockey cup competition
 Copa del Rey de Hockey Hierba, an annual Spanish field hockey cup competition
 Copa del Rey Juvenil de Fútbol, a Spanish youth football tournament
 Battle of Molino del Rey, a battle of the Mexican-American War

See also
 Koos de la Rey (1847–1914), Boer general in the Second Boer War
 Del Ray (disambiguation)